Tomasz Parzy (born December 17, 1979 in Leszno) is a Polish footballer who plays for Chojniczanka Chojnice.

Career

Club
In January 2011, he joined Chojniczanka Chojnice on a half year contract.

See also
Football in Poland
List of football clubs in Poland

References

External links 
 

1979 births
Living people
Polish footballers
Ekstraklasa players
Kania Gostyń players
Warta Poznań players
Obra Kościan players
Zawisza Bydgoszcz players
Ceramika Opoczno players
Pogoń Szczecin players
Arka Gdynia players
Wisła Płock players
Chojniczanka Chojnice players
People from Leszno
Sportspeople from Greater Poland Voivodeship
Association football midfielders